Terry Greer (born September 27, 1957) is a former professional American and Canadian football player who played wide receiver with the Canadian Football League Toronto Argonauts and the NFL Cleveland Browns as well as the San Francisco 49ers. He held the CFL record for most catches in a season; he is a member of the Argonauts all-time team and his #10 has been honored by the team. Terry Greer was the first to gain 2,000 yards receiving in a professional football season.

Greer was elected into the Canadian Football Hall of Fame in 2019.

Early life
Terry Greer was born on September 27, 1957 in Memphis, Tennessee to his mother, Pauline Greer and his father, Perry Key. He attended Alabama State University where he was offered both basketball and football athletic scholarships, choosing football.

Toronto Argonauts
Greer first was picked by the Los Angeles Rams in the 1980 NFL Draft but before playing a single game signed with the Canadian Football League team Toronto Argonauts. The 1983 season was his most productive year. He led the team to the Grey Cup in an 18-17 win over the BC Lions at BC Place Stadium. He was the MOP of the CFL East Division and was the first professional football receiver to gain 2,000 yards in a season, with 2,003. He left CFL to join the Cleveland Browns after the 1985 CFL season.

NFL career
Greer made his NFL debut with the Cleveland Browns in 1986, playing with the team for one season before being traded to the San Francisco 49ers. As a helper off the bench, Greer recorded 15 and 26 yards per catch in Super Bowl XXIII and Super Bowl XXIV seasons, respectively. He also recorded one regular season touchdown in his first season with the 49ers. In 1990, Greer made his last stand in his playing career with the Detroit Lions as he recorded 3 touchdowns before retiring.

Post football
He has two Super Bowl rings and a Grey Cup ring; he is also the first player in pro football history to win both championships; he is also one of only eight players to have won both championships. In 1996, Greer coached for the Hamilton Tiger-Cats for a season before officially retiring. Currently, he and his family live near Cleveland, Ohio. He is married with two daughter and a son.

Pro career stats

References

1957 births
Living people
American football wide receivers
Alabama State Hornets football players
American players of Canadian football
Toronto Argonauts players
Canadian football wide receivers
Cleveland Browns players
San Francisco 49ers players
Detroit Lions players
Players of American football from Memphis, Tennessee
Players of Canadian football from Memphis, Tennessee
National Football League replacement players